This article shows the rosters of all participating teams at the 2019 FIVB Volleyball Girls' U18 World Championship in Egypt.

Pool A

The following is the Brazilian roster in the 2019 FIVB Girls' U18 World Championship.

Head coach: Hylmer Do Nascimento Dias

The following is the Camerooni roster in the 2019 FIVB Girls' U18 World Championship.

Head coach: Rose Beleng A Ngon

The following is the Chinese roster in the 2019 FIVB Girls' U18 World Championship.

Head coach: Changwen Yu

The following is the Egyptian roster in the 2019 FIVB Girls' U18 World Championship.

Head coach: Marco Queiroga

The following is the Puerto Rican roster in the 2019 FIVB Girls' U18 World Championship.

Head coach: Juan C. Gonzalez

Pool B

The following is the Canadian roster in the 2019 FIVB Girls' U18 World Championship.

Head coach: Scott Koskie

The following is the Italian roster in the 2019 FIVB Girls' U18 World Championship.

Head coach: Marco Nazzareno Mencarelli

The following is the Korean roster in the 2019 FIVB Girls' U18 World Championship.

Head coach: Dongsun Seo

The following is the Mexican roster in the 2019 FIVB Girls' U18 World Championship.

Head coach: Ricardo De Jesus Naranjo Ponce

The following is the American roster in the 2019 FIVB Girls' U18 World Championship.

Head coach: James Stone

Pool C

The following is the Argentinian roster in the 2019 FIVB Girls' U18 World Championship.

Head coach: Roberto Woelflin

The following is the Belarusian roster in the 2019 FIVB Girls' U18 World Championship.

Head coach: Dzmitry Kot

The following is the Romanian  roster in the 2019 FIVB Girls' U18 World Championship.

Head coach: Marius Macarie

The following is the Russian roster in the 2019 FIVB Girls' U18 World Championship.

Head coach: Svetlana Safronova

The following is the Thai roster in the 2019 FIVB Girls' U18 World Championship.

Head coach: Kritideach Arjwichai

Pool D

The following is the Bulgarian roster in the 2019 FIVB Girls' U18 World Championship.

Head coach: Stoyan Gunchev

The following is the Congo roster in the 2019 FIVB Girls' U18 World Championship.

Head coach: Hamid Abdellaoui Maan

The following is the Japanese roster in the 2019 FIVB Girls' U18 World Championship.

Head coach: Daichi Saegusa

The following is the Peruvian roster in the 2019 FIVB Girls' U18 World Championship.

Head coach: Natalia Málaga Dibós

The following is the Turkish roster in the 2019 FIVB Girls' U18 World Championship.

Head coach: Çatma Şahin

References

External links
 Official website

FIVB Women's U18 World Championship
FIVB Volleyball World Championship squads